The Nutcracker is a 1967 Polish film directed by Halina Bielińska and based on E.T.A. Hoffmann's 1816 novelette "The Nutcracker and the Mouse King".

Cast
 Elżbieta Zagubień - Marynia
 Janusz Pomaski - Frycek
 Leon Niemczyk - Jan, the father 
 Barbara Wrzesińska - Kulia, the mother 
 Wieńczysław Gliński  - Drosselmajer / E.T.A. Hoffmann 
 Grzegorz Roman - Krystian Drosselmajer
 Zbigniew Miśkiewicz  - Amadeusz Drosselmajer 
 Józef Nalberczak - Mouse King
 Joanna Sołtan - Mouse Queen
 Joanna Walter - Antonina 
 Bogusław Sochnacki - Baker
 Jan Gwiazdowski - Chancellor
 Juliusz Lubicz-Lisowski
 Adam Pawlikowski - Private secretary
 Krzysztof Litwin - Teodor Wajs, theology student 
 Jerzy Wasowski - Criminal lawyer
 Magdalena Wołłejko - 
 Aleksander Dzwonkowski - Surgeon
 Mirosława Lombardo - 
 Krzysztof Świętochowski -  
 Jerzy Barankiewicz  - Astrologer
 Marek Kierlańczyk  - King
 Maciej Miśkiewicz - 
 Piotr Bieliński - 
 Marek Perepeczko 
 Krystyna Sienkiewicz 
 Maria Ciesielska 
 Iwona Biadoń
 Małgorzata Maciąg 
 Seweryn Hys 
 Justyna Fitowska 
 Krystyna Kanonowicz 
 Agnieszka Dylawerska 
 Renata Fitowska 
 Ewa Turska
 Adam Wojtyrowski  
 Małgorzata Kalicińska
 Karol Małcużyński
 Renata Fitowska  
 Aleksandra Leszczyńska
 Dorota Szymańska

See also
 List of Christmas films

External links

1967 films
Polish Christmas films
Films based on The Nutcracker and the Mouse King
Polish drama films
1960s Polish-language films